The General Handbook: Serving in The Church of Jesus Christ of Latter-day Saints is an on-line book of instructions and policies for leaders and members of the Church of Jesus Christ of Latter-day Saints (LDS Church). The contents are prepared by the church's First Presidency and Quorum of the Twelve Apostles. Along with the church's standard works (i.e., its scriptural canon), the General Handbook stands as the preeminent policy and practice guide for the leaders of the LDS Church.

Purpose
In general, the General Handbook contains institutional church policies, as opposed to church doctrine. However, brief statements of doctrine are commonly presented at the start of sections in the handbook to provide the doctrinal context in which the policies are being set and implemented. In that way, the General Handbook unifies the church's scripture and creeds with its ecclesiology and polity.

The General Handbook acts as a "standard reference point" for bishops and other leaders to make decisions. The leaders are encouraged to follow the handbook "with the guidance of the Holy Ghost" and with "sensitivity to individual circumstances."

Contents and distribution
The topics in the General Handbook include guidelines involving general, area, and regional administration; duties of the stake president; duties of the bishop; temples and marriage; missionary service; administering church welfare; church membership councils and name removal; interviews and counseling; physical facilities; creating, changing, and naming new units; military relations; Church Educational System; Perpetual Education Fund; records and reports; finances; stake patriarch; ordinance and blessing policies; general church policies on administrative, medical and health, and moral issues. It also contains information primarily relevant to the functions of the leaders of the church's priesthood quorums and auxiliary organizations. In this area, the topics include guidelines involving families and the church in God's plan, priesthood principles, leadership in the church, the ward council, the work of salvation in the ward and stake, welfare principles and leadership, Melchizedek priesthood, Aaronic priesthood, Relief Society, Young Women, Primary, Sunday School, activities, music, stake organization, single members, uniformity and adaptation, meetings in the church, callings in the church, and priesthood ordinances and blessings.

Beginning in 2020, the handbook became available on the church website and other digital resources.  This handbook superseded previous revisions, namely Handbook 1 (for stake presidents and bishops) and Handbook 2 (for all leaders), combining all information into a single digital publication. The material is primarily intended for church leaders.

Unauthorized distribution
Prior to 2020, portions of the Handbook were not publicly available. In the past, unauthorized copies of the restricted handbook have been made available on the internet.

After the 1998 version of the Church Handbook was published, Jerald and Sandra Tanner's Utah Lighthouse Ministry published portions on the internet without the church's permission or the book's copyright notice. The text was also disseminated to other websites to which the ULM's website linked. In a 1999 lawsuit Intellectual Reserve v. Utah Lighthouse Ministry, a United States district court issued an injunction prohibiting the further duplication of the contents of the handbook and ordered ULM to remove the offending material from its website.

In May 2008, the LDS Church notified the Wikimedia Foundation that it believed the copyright to the Handbook of Instructions had been violated by a link posted in Wikinews. The link directed readers to the text of the handbook on the WikiLeaks website, unaffiliated with the Wikimedia Foundation. Shortly after the complaint was made, Wikinews removed the link to the text from the article.

In 2010, the church placed part of the handbook on its official website, which was seen as "part of a recent trend in the church to become more transparent." In 2020, the entirety of the General Handbook was placed online.

Media discussion 
Although the General Handbook covers a wide variety of topics related to church organization and policy, media attention has focused largely on the church's policies on social issues that are outlined in the Handbook. As summarized by the Salt Lake Tribune, the Handbook states that the LDS Church

opposes gambling (including government-run lotteries), guns in churches, euthanasia, Satan worship and hypnotism for entertainment. It "strongly discourages" surrogate motherhood, sperm donation, surgical sterilizations (including vasectomies) and artificial insemination — when "using semen from anyone but the husband." But [the church] supports organ donation, paying income taxes, members running for political office and autopsies."

Regarding birth control, the Tribune comments:

The handbook says it is a "privilege" for Mormon couples to nurture and rear children, but the decision of how many to have is "extremely intimate and private and should be left between the couple and the Lord." Moreover, church members "should not judge one another in this matter." The book also says sexual relations in marriage "are divinely approved not only for the purpose of procreation, but also as a way of expressing love and strengthening emotional and spiritual bonds between husband and wife."

The Tribune has also noted that the LDS Church discourages the use of in vitro fertilization using semen and ova from people outside the couple and that the LDS Church has no official stance on drinking Coca-Cola.

The Tribune quoted one member of the church as applauding the public availability of the Handbook, as it will allow the members of the church to become more familiar with the church's stance on certain social issues:

“I've known church members who were shocked that the handbook strongly discourages vasectomies. They had no idea that there was any policy concerning it.... If there are such policies, I think it is wise that everyone — not just those with leadership callings — knows about them."

Some members have complained that the General Handbook does not always explain the doctrinal justification for the church's stance on certain social issues, such as that related to artificial insemination of single women in the church. The General Handbook states that artificial insemination of single women in the church "is not approved" and that "single sisters who deliberately refuse to follow the counsel of church leaders in this matter are subject to church discipline" but it does not explain why similar treatment would not be meted out to single women in the church who adopt children.

History

The document that is identified as the first Church Handbook of Instructions was published in 1899 as a small, 14-page booklet. It primarily contained instructions on how to manage in-kind payments of tithing by church members. The handbook was revised every year until 1910 and approximately every five years thereafter. The book has been variously called the Annual Instructions, the Circular of Instructions, the Handbook of Instructions, the General Handbook of Instructions, the Church Handbook of Instructions, and finally the Handbook.

In 1998, the book was split into two volumes for the first time and was renamed the Church Handbook of Instructions. A new edition was published and released to church leaders in November 2010, with the new names Handbook 1 and Handbook 2. One of the major changes between the 2006 and 2010 versions of the handbook is that the 2010 version "softened the language about gay Mormons" and eliminated statements "that same-sex relationships 'distort loving relationships' and that gays should repent of their 'homosexual thoughts or feelings.'" In 2020, the two-volume handbook was consolidated into a single volume and it was published online in its entirety for the first time.<ref name = 2020sltrib>Peggy Fletcher Stack and David Noyce, "LDS Church publishes new handbook with changes to discipline, transgender policy", Salt Lake Tribune, February 19, 2020.</ref> As compared to earlier editions, the 2020 General Handbook'' has a "softer tone on discipline, [an] emphasis on pastoral care, ... clarity on complex issues and [a] push for greater compassion toward same-sex and transgender members".

Chronology
The following chronological listing of the publication's history was taken from an article by Edward L. Kimball (until 24(A)), supplemented with a list of later editions:

Further reading

References

External links

General Handbook: Serving in The Church of Jesus Christ of Latter-day Saints, churchofjesuschrist.org

1899 books
1899 in Christianity
2020 non-fiction books
2020 in Christianity
Latter Day Saint statements of faith
Church organization
Religious handbooks and manuals
The Church of Jesus Christ of Latter-day Saints texts